The Cathedral of the Annunciation of Mary  also called Gospić Cathedral It is a Catholic church in the city of Gospić in Croatia, and the seat of the Diocese of Gospić-Senj.

The current cathedral was built between 1781 and 1783 in Baroque style. During the Yugoslav Wars on September 15, 1991, the church burned down: the roof and the top of the tower burned completely, while the interior of the church was damaged by fire. The reconstruction began in 1992 and ended in 1999.

On May 25, 2000, with the Bull "Ad christifidelium spirituali" Pope John Paul II erected the Diocese of Gospić-Senj, while bringing the church to the status of cathedral.

See also
Roman Catholicism in Croatia

References

Roman Catholic cathedrals in Croatia
Buildings and structures in Gospić
Roman Catholic churches completed in 1783
Buildings and structures in Lika-Senj County
18th-century Roman Catholic church buildings in Croatia
Baroque church buildings in Croatia